Sally Potocki (born 11 February 1989) is a retired Australian handball player who last played for Bayer Leverkusen in 1.Bundesliga and the Australian national team.

During her time at BVB Dortmund Potocki captained the team. She was co captained of Bayer Leverkusen.

She represented and captained Australia at the 2019 IHF world championships in Japan, she also participated in the 2013 World Women's Handball Championship in Serbia and in 2007 in France. In 2018 after a 6 years break from playing for Australia, she returned to the squad for the Asian Championships in Japan where she was topscorer of the tournament and largely contributed to helping Australia qualifying for their first World Championships since 2013. Potocki returned to Japan with the Australian team for the IHF World Championships 2019.

Potocki previously played basketball professionally. Between 2007 and 2011, she played for the Sydney Uni Flames of the Australian Women's National Basketball League. Potocki was also part of the Opal's squad.

Statistics

References

Australian female handball players
1989 births
Living people
Expatriate handball players
Australian expatriate sportspeople in Germany
Sportspeople from Melbourne